Chun Keun-bae (Korean:전근배) is a South Korean Paralympic powerlifter. He represented South Korea at the Summer Paralympics in 2012, 2016 and 2021. He won the bronze medal in the men's +100 kg event in 2012.

References

External links 
 

Living people
Year of birth missing (living people)
Place of birth missing (living people)
South Korean powerlifters
Powerlifters at the 2012 Summer Paralympics
Powerlifters at the 2016 Summer Paralympics
Powerlifters at the 2020 Summer Paralympics
Medalists at the 2012 Summer Paralympics
Paralympic bronze medalists for South Korea
Paralympic medalists in powerlifting
Paralympic powerlifters of South Korea
21st-century South Korean people